Tirumalkoppa is a village in Dharwad district of Karnataka, India.

Demographics 
As of the 2011 Census of India there were 181 households in Tirumalkoppa and a total population of 974 consisting of 481 males and 493 females. There were 128 children ages 0-6.

References

Villages in Dharwad district